Głuszyn , is a village in the administrative district of Gmina Krasnopol, within Sejny County, Podlaskie Voivodeship, in north-eastern Poland.

References

Villages in Sejny County